Abraham Oppenheim (24 May 1804 in Cologne – 9 October 1878 in Cologne), titled in 1868 as Abraham Freiherr von Oppenheim, was a German banker and patron.

Life and career
Oppenheim was the second son among the twelve children of banker Salomon Oppenheim, Jr. and his wife Therese Stein (1775–1842). Stein (also known as Deigen Levi) was the daughter of a businessman from Dülmen.

The eldest son of Salomon Oppenheim, Jr., joined his father's banking house in 1821. Abraham followed in the same year, and their mother Therese Oppenheim was given signatory power.

In 1826, Salomon Oppenheim gave his sons Simon and Abraham general power of attorney to continue the banking business. In 1828, Abraham was made a partner. The brothers transformed their father's commission and exchange house into a major private bank.

Abraham Oppenheim figured prominently in the finances of the German railway system, insurance industry, and the engineering and cotton industries. In 1868, he became the first unbaptised Jew to be ennobled in Prussia, being created a Baron and being admitted to the inner circle of Wilhelm I. Together with  Gerson Bleichröder and other bankers, he advised the monarch on financing the Austro-Prussian War of 1866 through government bonds. The Prussian ruler rejected the plan of Oppenheim and Bleichröder, advocated by Bismarck, to finance the war by privatizing state-owned mines in the Saar.

See also
 Oppenheim family

Notes

References

Bibliography

External links

1804 births
1878 deaths
19th-century German Jews
Court Jews
German bankers
19th-century German businesspeople